Dubai Export Development Corporation (EDC) is an organization in Dubai, United Arab Emirates, created to advocate and assist exporting to foster economic development of the region. The EDC began operations in 2007, having been established in 2006 under Law No. 10/2006 by the Government of Dubai. Although autonomous, the EDC operates under governmental directive.

External links
Dubai Export Development Corporation — Official website
Dubai's trade to grow 11% this year
Dubai Export Development Corporation and Austrade sign Tradelink Partnership

Economy of Dubai
Government agencies of Dubai